Jeffrey Amestoy (born July 24, 1946) is an American retired jurist from Vermont. He served as Vermont Attorney General from 1985 to 1997 and as Chief Justice of the Vermont Supreme Court from 1997 to 2004. Amestoy is noted for having authored the majority opinion in Baker v. Vermont, the 1999 Vermont Supreme Court decision that led to the legalization of civil unions for same-sex partners in Vermont in 2000.

Biography
Jeffrey Amestoy was born in Rutland, Vermont. He has Basque ancestry on his father's side. He received a B.A. from Hobart College in Geneva, New York, his J.D. from Hastings Law School at the University of California, and his Master of Public Administration degree from Harvard University. He served in the United States Army Reserve from 1968 to 1974.

A Republican, Amestoy served as counsel to the Governor of Vermont’s Commission on the Administration of Justice from 1974 to 1976. He went on to become an assistant attorney general, a chief prosecutor of the Attorney General’s Medicaid Fraud Division, and a commissioner of labor and industry.

In 1984, Amestoy ran successfully for Vermont Attorney General, defeating state Representative Bruce M. Lawlor in the general election. He served as attorney general from 1985 to 1997.

Following the retirement of Frederic W. Allen, Governor Howard Dean appointed Amestoy to serve as Chief Justice of the Vermont Supreme Court. Amestoy was succeeded as Attorney General by William Sorrell.

As chief justice, Amestoy authored the opinion of the Vermont Supreme Court in Baker v. Vermont, 744 A.2d 864 (Vt. 1999), which held that the state's denial of marriage rights to same-sex couples violated the Vermont Constitution. The court ordered the Vermont legislature to either allow same-sex marriages or implement an alternative legal mechanism according similar rights to same-sex couples. On April 27, 2000, Gov. Howard Dean signed legislation making Vermont the first U.S. state to allow same-sex civil unions.

Amestoy retired from the court on June 16, 2004, and was succeeded as Chief Justice by Paul L. Reiber. After his retirement, Amestoy returned to Harvard as a Fellow at the Institute of Politics and at the Harvard Kennedy School's Center for Public Leadership.

Amestoy is the author of Slavish Shore: The Odyssey of Richard Henry Dana Jr. (Harvard University Press, 2015). His article entitled "The Supreme Court Argument that Saved the Union: Richard Henry Dana Jr. and the Prize Cases" (Journal of Supreme Court History 2010) was awarded the Supreme Court Historical Society's Hughes-Gossett Prize.

Amestoy and his wife, Susan, have two daughters.

See also
Vermont vs Hunt (1982)

References

1946 births
People from Rutland, Vermont
Hobart and William Smith Colleges alumni
University of California, Hastings College of the Law alumni
Harvard Kennedy School alumni
Vermont lawyers
Vermont Republicans
Vermont Attorneys General
Chief Justices of the Vermont Supreme Court
Living people